Irmgard Latz (later Irmgard Gerlatzka) (born 14 March 1939) is a former female badminton player from Germany.

Career
She won the gold medal at the 1968 European Badminton Championships in women's singles. Two years later, in 1970, she won the silver medal in women's doubles with Marieluise Wackerow, losing the final to Margaret Boxall and Susan Whetnall.

She won her first German national title in 1960 in women's doubles, with Ute Melcher.

References
Martin Knupp: Deutscher Badminton Almanach, Deutscher Badminton-Verband (2003), 230 pages

German female badminton players
1939 births
Living people
People from Viersen (district)
Sportspeople from Düsseldorf (region)